KRDN-LP was a low-power television station in Redding, California. It broadcast locally in analog on VHF channel 5 and is an affiliate of the Daystar Television Network.  Founded June 13, 2002, the station was owned by KM Communications Inc. of Skokie, Illinois.

It had an application to flash-cut on channel 5 at 300 W.

KRDN went off the air on April 27, 2012, due to financial issues that resulted in the station losing its transmitter site; it never returned to the air, and the license was canceled on June 19, 2013.

References

Defunct television stations in the United States
RDN-LP
Television channels and stations established in 2002
2002 establishments in California
Television channels and stations disestablished in 2012
2012 establishments in California
RDN-LP